Antonio de Luca (born August 24, 1975) is a Canadian creative director and photobook designer based in New York. He is an assistant editor and visual columnist at The New York Times. 

In 2010 de Luca partnered with Bruno Ceschel's organisation Self Publish, Be Happy as art director to design, promote and publish self-published photobooks. In 2013 he became the art director and designer of Five Dials a digital literary magazine published from London by Hamish Hamilton.

As art director for Self Publish, Be Happy de Luca was awarded Best Photography Books of 2012 by The Guardian, The Best Books of 2012 by Photo-Eye and Time Best of 2012: The Photobooks We Loved. He has also curated Follow Me for Either/And commissioned by The National Media Museum London, on humankind's desire to follow.

De Luca is the founder and curator of an international illustration exhibition called The 100 $HOW™.

Publications 
 Self Publish Be Naughty. London: Self Publish, Be Happy, 2011.
 American Photography 27. 2012. .
 Geneva Test by Adrien Guillet. 2012. .
 SPBH Vol I by Adam Broomberg & Oliver Chanarin. London: Self Publish, Be Happy, 2012.
 SPBH Vol. II by Brad Feuerhelm. London: Self Publish, Be Happy, 2012.
 SPBH Vol. III by Cristina De Middel. London: Self Publish, Be Happy, 2013.
 Occupy São Paulo by Carlos Cazalis. , 2013.
 SPBH Vol. IV by Mariah Robertson. London: Self Publish, Be Happy, 2013.
 Fire in Cairo by Matthew Connors. SPBH Editions, London, 2015.

References

External links

1975 births
Living people
Canadian art directors
Canadian designers
Canadian illustrators
Canadian photographers
Artists from Toronto
OCAD University alumni